Burhanettin Bigalı (1927 – 19 September 2016) was a Turkish general; he retired in 1990. He was head of the National Intelligence Organization (1981 - 1986) and later General Commander of the Gendarmerie of Turkey (1988 - 1990). 

Arif Doğan has claimed in court that he founded the Gendarmerie's JITEM intelligence unit in the late 1980s on the orders of Bigalı, with the approval of the Chief of Staff and of the Interior Ministry.

References 

1927 births
2016 deaths
Turkish Army generals
General Commanders of the Gendarmerie of Turkey
People of the National Intelligence Organization (Turkey)
Commanders of the Second Army of Turkey